This is a list of mayors of Jerez de la Frontera.

Mayors of Jerez de la Frontera

References 

Jerez de la Frontera